Borznyansky Uyezd (Борзнянский уезд) was one of the subdivisions of the Chernigov Governorate of the Russian Empire. It was situated in the southern part of the governorate. Its administrative centre was Borzna.

Demographics
At the time of the Russian Empire Census of 1897, Borznyansky Uyezd had a population of 146,595. Of these, 93.8% spoke Ukrainian, 3.0% German, 2.5% Yiddish, 0.6% Russian, 0.1% Polish and 0.1% Belarusian as their native language.

References

 
Uyezds of Chernigov Governorate
Chernigov Governorate